Topoľčianky is a village and municipality in Zlaté Moravce District of the Nitra Region, in western-central Slovakia.

History
In historical records the village was first mentioned in 1293.

Tourism

Topoľčianky is unique for its European Bison Reserve. By the 1930s only a handful of wisents remained, in Poland. A captive breeding population was established and at the time the Topoľčianky reserve was established in 1958, there were 150.
The global population is now over 3,000, and in 2004 the reserve started releasing small groups into the Poloniny National Park in eastern Slovakia, where they appear to be thriving.

In nearby Topoľčianky itself, is a Renaissance castle at which the first president of Czechoslovakia, Tomáš Garrigue Masaryk, holidayed every summer between 1923 and 1933.
The landscaped gardens which surround the castle are spectacular, and include an early 20th-century hunting lodge surrounded by bronzes of deer and other quarry in their death throes. 
The castle's southern wing, reconstructed in the early 19th century, is regarded as the purest example of neoclassical architecture in Slovakia, and is open to the public (the rest is now a hotel).

Geography
The municipality lies at an altitude of 220 metres and covers an area of 26.327 km2. It is located in the northeastern part of county Zlate Moravce. 
Topoľcianky lies in the upper part of Požitava lowland, surrounded by the mountain chains of Pohronský Inovec and Tribeč.
It has a population of about 2,870 people. In the means of transport the municipality is situated 120 km from the capital city Bratislava and 5 km from Zlaté Moravce, the county seat.

See also
Chateau Topolcianky

References

External links
http://www.topolcianky.sk

Villages and municipalities in Zlaté Moravce District